The Limits to Growth (LTG) is a 1972 report that discussed the possibility of exponential economic and population growth with finite supply of resources, studied by computer simulation. The study used the World3 computer model to simulate the consequence of interactions between the earth and human systems. The model was based on the work of Jay Forrester of MIT, as described in his book World Dynamics.

Commissioned by the Club of Rome, the findings of the study were first presented at international gatherings in Moscow and Rio de Janeiro in the summer of 1971. The report's authors are Donella H. Meadows, Dennis L. Meadows, Jørgen Randers, and William W. Behrens III, representing a team of 17 researchers.

The report concludes that, without substantial changes in resource consumption, "the most probable result will be a rather sudden and uncontrollable decline in both population and industrial capacity". Although its methods and premises were heavily challenged on its publication, subsequent work to validate its forecasts continue to confirm that insufficient changes have been made since 1972 to significantly alter their nature.

Since its publication, some 30 million copies of the book in 30 languages have been purchased. It continues to generate debate and has been the subject of several subsequent publications.

Beyond the Limits and The Limits to Growth: The 30-Year Update were published in 1992 and 2004 respectively, in 2012, a 40-year forecast from Jørgen Randers, one of the book's original authors, was published as 2052: A Global Forecast for the Next Forty Years, and in 2022 two of the original Limits to Growth authors, Dennis Meadows and Jorgen Randers, joined 19 other contributors to produce Limits and Beyond.

Purpose
In commissioning the MIT team to undertake the project that resulted in LTG, the Club of Rome had three objectives:
 Gain insights into the limits of our world system and the constraints it puts on human numbers and activity.
 Identify and study the dominant elements, and their interactions, that influence the long-term behavior of world systems.
 To warn of the likely outcome of contemporary economic and industrial policies, with a view to influencing changes to a sustainable lifestyle.

Methodology
The World3 model is based on five variables: "population, food production, industrialization, pollution, and consumption of nonrenewable natural resources". At the time of the study, all these variables were increasing and were assumed to continue to grow exponentially, while the ability of technology to increase resources grew only linearly. The authors intended to explore the possibility of a sustainable feedback pattern that would be achieved by altering growth trends among the five variables under three scenarios. They noted that their projections for the values of the variables in each scenario were predictions "only in the most limited sense of the word", and were only indications of the system's behavioral tendencies. Two of the scenarios saw "overshoot and collapse" of the global system by the mid- to latter-part of the 21st century, while a third scenario resulted in a "stabilized world".

Exponential reserve index
A key idea in The Limits to Growth is the notion that if the rate of resource use is increasing, the number of reserves cannot be calculated by simply taking the current known reserves and dividing them by the current yearly usage, as is typically done to obtain a static index. For example, in 1972, the amount of chromium reserves was 775 million metric tons, of which 1.85 million metric tons were mined annually. The static index is 775/1.85=418 years, but the rate of chromium consumption was growing at 2.6 percent annually, or exponentially. If instead of assuming a constant rate of usage, the assumption of a constant rate of growth of 2.6 percent annually is made, the resource will instead last

In general, the formula for calculating the amount of time left for a resource with constant consumption growth is:

where:
y = years left;
r = the continuous compounding growth rate;
s = R/C or static reserve;
R = reserve;
C = (annual) consumption.

Commodity reserve extrapolation 
The chapter contains a large table that spans five pages in total, based on actual geological reserves data for a total of 19 non-renewable resources, and analyzes their reserves at 1972 modeling time of their exhaustion under three scenarios: static (constant growth), exponential, and exponential with reserves multiplied by 5 to account for possible discoveries. A short excerpt from the table is presented below:
{| class="wikitable"
! colspan="2" | !! colspan="3" | Years
|-valign="top"
!align="left"|Resource!!Consumption, projected average annual growth rate!!Static index!!Exponential index!!5× reserves exponential index
|-
|width="100"|Chromium||width="100" align="right" |2.6%||width="100" align="right" |420||width="100" align="right"|95||width="100" align="right"|154
|-
|Gold||align="right"|4.1%||align="right"|11||align="right"|9||align="right"|29
|-
|Iron||align="right"|1.8%||align="right"|240||align="right"|93||align="right"|173
|-
|Lead||align="right"|2.0%||align="right"|26||align="right"|21||align="right"|64
|-
|Petroleum||align="right"|3.9%||align="right"|31||align="right"|20||align="right"|50
|}

The chapter also contains a detailed computer model of chromium availability with current (as of 1972) and double the known reserves as well as numerous statements on the current increasing price trends for discussed metals:

Due to the detailed nature and use of actual resources and their real-world price trends, the indexes have been interpreted as a prediction of the number of years until the world would "run out" of them, both by environmentalist groups calling for greater conservation and restrictions on use and by skeptics criticizing the accuracy of the predictions. This interpretation has been widely propagated by media and environmental organizations, and authors who, apart from a note about the possibility of the future flows being "more complicated", did not clearly constrain or deny this interpretation. While environmental organizations used it to support their arguments, a number of economists used it to criticize LTG as a whole shortly after publication in the 1970s (Peter Passel, Marc Roberts, and Leonard Ross), with similar criticism reoccurring from Ronald Baily, George Goodman and others in the 1990s. In 2011 Ugo Bardi in "The Limits to Growth Revisited" argued that "nowhere in the book was it stated that the numbers were supposed to be read as predictions", nonetheless as they were the only tangible numbers referring to actual resources, they were promptly picked as such by both supporters as well as opponents.

While Chapter 2 serves as an introduction to the concept of exponential growth modeling, the actual World3 model uses an abstract "non-renewable resources" component based on static coefficients rather than the actual physical commodities described above.

Conclusions
After reviewing their computer simulations, the research team came to the following conclusions:

The introduction goes on to say:

Criticism

LTG provoked a wide range of responses, including immediate criticisms almost as soon as it was published.

Peter Passell and two co-authors published a 2 April 1972 article in the New York Times describing LTG as "an empty and misleading work ... best summarized ... as a rediscovery of the oldest maxim of computer science: Garbage In, Garbage Out". Passell found the study's simulation to be simplistic while assigning little value to the role of technological progress in solving the problems of resource depletion, pollution, and food production. They charged that all LTG simulations ended in collapse, predicting the imminent end of irreplaceable resources. Passell also charged that the entire endeavour was motivated by a hidden agenda: to halt growth in its tracks.

In 1973, a group of researchers at the Science Policy Research Unit at the University of Sussex concluded that simulations in Limits to Growth were very sensitive to a few key assumptions and suggest that the MIT assumptions were unduly pessimistic, and the MIT methodology, data, and projections were faulty.  However, the LTG team, in a paper entitled "A Response to Sussex", described and analyzed five major areas of disagreement between themselves and the Sussex authors. The team asserted that the Sussex critics applied "micro reasoning to macro problems", and suggested that their own arguments had been either misunderstood or wilfully misrepresented. They pointed out that the critics had failed to suggest any alternative model for the interaction of growth processes and resource availability, and "nor had they described in precise terms the sort of social change and technological advances that they believe would accommodate current growth processes."

At the time, "the very hint of any global limitation as suggested in the report [...] was met with disbelief and rejection by businesses 
and most economists." Critics declared that history proved the projections to be incorrect, such as the predicted resource depletion and associated economic collapse by the end of the 20th century.  The methodology, the computer, the conclusions, the rhetoric and the people behind the project were criticised. Yale economist Henry C. Wallich agreed that growth could not continue indefinitely, but that a natural end to growth was preferable to intervention. Wallich stated that technology could solve all the problems the report was concerned about, but only if growth continued apace. By stopping growth too soon, Wallich warned, the world would be "consigning billions to permanent poverty".

Julian Simon, a professor at the Universities of Illinois and, later, Maryland, argued that the fundamental underlying concepts of the LTG scenarios were faulty because the very idea of what constitutes a "resource" varies over time. For instance, wood was the primary shipbuilding resource until the 1800s, and there were concerns about prospective wood shortages from the 1500s on. But then boats began to be made of iron, later steel, and the shortage issue disappeared. Simon argued in his book The Ultimate Resource that human ingenuity creates new resources as required from the raw materials of the universe.  For instance, copper will never "run out". History demonstrates that as it becomes scarcer its price will rise and more will be found, more will be recycled, new techniques will use less of it, and at some point a better substitute will be found for it altogether. His book was revised and reissued in 1996 as The Ultimate Resource 2.

To the US Congress in 1973,  Allen V. Kneese and Ronald Riker of Resources for the Future (RFF) testified that in their view, "The authors load their case by letting some things grow exponentially and others not. Population, capital and pollution grow exponentially in all models, but technologies for expanding resources and controlling pollution are permitted to grow, if at all, only in discrete increments."  However, their testimony also noted the possibility of "relatively firm long-term limits" associated with carbon dioxide emissions, that humanity might "loose upon itself, or the ecosystem services on which it depends, a disastrously virulent substance", and (implying that population growth in "developing countries" is problematic) that "we don't know what to do about it".

In 1997, the Italian economist Giorgio Nebbia observed that the negative reaction to the LTG study came from at least four sources: those who saw the book as a threat to their business or industry; professional economists, who saw LTG as an uncredentialed encroachment on their professional perquisites; the Catholic church, which bridled at the suggestion that overpopulation was one of mankind's major problems; finally, the political left, which saw the LTG study as a scam by the elites designed to trick workers into believing that a proletarian paradise was a pipe dream.

Positive reviews

In a 2008 blog post, Ugo Bardi commented that "Although, by the 1990s LTG had become everyone's laughing stock, among some the LTG ideas are becoming again popular". Reading LTG for the first time in 2000, Matthew Simmons concluded his views on the report by saying, "In hindsight, The Club of Rome turned out to be right. We simply wasted 30 important years ignoring this work." Research from the University of Melbourne has found the book's forecasts are accurate, 40 years on.

In 2008 Graham Turner of CSIRO found that the observed historical data from 1970 to 2000 closely match the simulated results of the "standard run" limits of growth model for almost all the outputs reported. "The comparison is well within uncertainty bounds of nearly all the data in terms of both magnitude and the trends over time." Turner also examined a number of reports, particularly by economists, which over the years have purported to discredit the limits-to-growth model. Turner says these reports are flawed, and reflect misunderstandings about the model.

Turner reprised these observations in another opinion piece in The Guardian in 2014. Turner used data from the UN to claim that the graphs almost exactly matched the 'Standard Run' from 1972 (i.e. the worst-case scenario, assuming that a 'business as usual' attitude was adopted, and there were no modifications of human behaviour in response to the warnings in the report). Birth rates and death rates were both slightly lower than projected, but these two effects cancelled each other out, leaving the growth in world population almost exactly as forecast.

In 2010, Nørgård, Peet and Ragnarsdóttir called the book a "pioneering report", and said that it "has withstood the test of time and, indeed, has only become more relevant."

The journalist Christian Parenti, writing in 2012, sees parallels between the reception of LTG and the contemporary global warming controversy, and went on to comment, "That said, The Limits to Growth was a scientifically rigorous and credible warning that was actively rejected by the intellectual watchdogs of powerful economic interests. A similar story is playing out now around climate science."

In 2012, John Scales Avery, a member of the Nobel Prize (1995) winning group associated with the Pugwash Conferences on Science and World Affairs, supported the basic thesis of LTG by stating, "Although the specific predictions of resource availability in [The] Limits to Growth lacked accuracy, its basic thesis – that unlimited economic growth on a finite planet is impossible – was indisputably correct."

Legacy

Updates and symposia

The Club of Rome has persisted after The Limits to Growth and has generally provided comprehensive updates to the book every five years.

An independent retrospective on the public debate over The Limits to Growth concluded in 1978 that optimistic attitudes had won out, causing a general loss of momentum in the environmental movement. While summarizing a large number of opposing arguments, the article concluded that "scientific arguments for and against each position ... have, it would seem, played only a small part in the general acceptance of alternative perspectives."

In 1989, a symposium was held in Hanover, entitled "Beyond the Limits to Growth: Global Industrial Society, Vision or Nightmare?" and in 1992, Beyond the Limits (BTL) was published as a 20-year update on the original material. It "concluded that two decades of history mainly supported the conclusions we had advanced 20 years earlier. But the 1992 book did offer one major new finding. We suggested in BTL that humanity had already overshot the limits of Earth's support capacity."

Limits to Growth: The 30-Year Update was published in 2004. The authors observed that "It is a sad fact that humanity has largely squandered the past 30 years in futile debates and well-intentioned, but halfhearted, responses to the global ecological challenge. We do not have another 30 years to dither. Much will have to change if the ongoing overshoot is not to be followed by collapse during the twenty-first century."

In 2012, the Smithsonian Institution held a symposium entitled "Perspectives on Limits to Growth". Another symposium was held in the same year by the Volkswagen Foundation, entitled "Already Beyond?"

Limits to Growth did not receive an official update in 2012, but one of its coauthors, Jørgen Randers, published a book, 2052: A Global Forecast for the Next Forty Years.

Validation
In 2008, physicist Graham Turner at the Commonwealth Scientific and Industrial Research Organisation (CSIRO) in Australia published a paper called "A Comparison of 'The Limits to Growth' with Thirty Years of Reality". It compared the past thirty years of data with the scenarios laid out in the 1972 book and found that changes in industrial production, food production, and pollution are all congruent with one of the book's three scenarios—that of "business as usual". This scenario in Limits points to economic and societal collapse in the 21st century. In 2010, Nørgård, Peet, and Ragnarsdóttir called the book a "pioneering report". They said that, "its approach remains useful and that its conclusions are still surprisingly valid ... unfortunately the report has been largely dismissed by critics as a doomsday prophecy that has not held up to scrutiny."

Also in 2008, researcher Peter A. Victor wrote that even though the Limits team probably underestimated price mechanism's role in adjusting outcomes, their critics have overestimated it. He states that Limits to Growth has had a significant impact on the conception of environmental issues and notes that (in his view) the models in the book were meant to be taken as predictions "only in the most limited sense of the word".

In a 2009 article published in American Scientist entitled Revisiting the Limits to Growth After Peak Oil, Hall and Day noted that "the values predicted by the limits-to-growth model and actual data for 2008 are very close." These findings are consistent with the 2008 CSIRO study which concluded: "The analysis shows that 30 years of historical data compares favorably with key features ... [of the Limits to Growth] "standard run" scenario, which results in collapse of the global system midway through the 21st Century."

In 2011, Ugo Bardi published a book-length academic study of The Limits to Growth, its methods, and historical reception and concluded that "The warnings that we received in 1972 ... are becoming increasingly more worrisome as reality seems to be following closely the curves that the ... scenario had generated." A popular analysis of the accuracy of the report by science writer Richard Heinberg was also published.

In 2012, writing in American Scientist, Brian Hayes stated that the model is "more a polemical tool than a scientific instrument". He went on to say that the graphs generated by the computer program should not, as the authors note, be used as predictions.

In 2014, Turner concluded that "preparing for a collapsing global system could be even more important than trying to avoid collapse."

In 2015, a calibration of the updated World3-03 model using historical data from 1995 to 2012 to better understand the dynamics of today's economic and resource system was undertaken. The results showed that human society has invested more to abate persistent pollution, increase food productivity and have a more productive service sector however the broad trends within Limits to Growth still held true.

In 2016, a report published by the UK Parliament's 'All-Party Parliamentary Group on Limits to Growth' concluded that "there is unsettling evidence that society is still following the 'standard run' of the original study – in which overshoot leads to an eventual collapse of production and living standards". The report also points out that some issues not fully addressed in the original 1972 report, such as climate change, present additional challenges for human development.

In 2020, an analysis by Gaya Herrington, then Director of Sustainability Services of KPMG US, was published in Yale University's Journal of Industrial Ecology. The study assessed whether, given key data known in 2020 about factors important for the "Limits to Growth" report, the original report's conclusions are supported. In particular, the 2020 study examined updated quantitative information about ten factors, namely population, fertility rates, mortality rates, industrial output, food production, services, non-renewable resources, persistent pollution, human welfare, and ecological footprint, and concluded that the "Limits to Growth" prediction is essentially correct in that continued economic growth is unsustainable under a "business as usual" model. The study found that current empirical data is broadly consistent with the 1972 projections and that if major changes to the consumption of resources are not undertaken, economic growth will peak and then rapidly decline by around 2040.

Related books
Books about humanity's uncertain future have appeared regularly over the years. A few of them, including the books mentioned above for reference, include:

 An Essay on the Principle of Population by Thomas Malthus (1798); 
 Road to Survival by William Vogt (1948);
 The Challenge of Man's Future by Harrison Brown (1956); 
 Mirage of Health by Rene Dubos (1959);
 The Hungry Planet by Georg Bostrom (1965);
 The Population Bomb by Paul R. Ehrlich (1968);
 The Limits to Growth (1972);
 Overshoot by William R. Catton (1980);
 State of the World reports issued by the Worldwatch Institute (produced annually since 1984); 
 Our Common Future, published by the UN's World Commission on Environment and Development (1987); 
 Earth in the Balance, written by then-US senator Al Gore (1992); 
 Earth Odyssey by journalist Mark Hertsgaard (1999);
 The Limits to Growth: The 30-Year Update (2004);
 The Long Emergency by James Howard Kunstler (2005);
 Storms of My Grandchildren by James Hansen,  (2009);
 The Limits to Growth Revisited by Ugo Bardi, Springer Briefs in Energy,  (2011);
 2052: A Global Forecast for the Next Forty Years by Jørgen Randers (2012);
 10 Billion by Stephen Emmott (2013);
 The Bet by Paul Sabin, Yale University Press (2014);
 The Sixth Extinction by Elizabeth Kolbert (2014);
 The Uninhabitable Earth by David Wallace-Wells (2017);
 Limits and Beyond edited by Ugo Bardi and Carlos Alvarez Pereira, Exapt Press,  (2022).
 Earth for All – A Survival Guide for Humanity (2022).

Editions
 , 1972 first edition (digital version)
 , 1974 second edition (cloth)
 , 1974 second edition (paperback)
 
 
 

See also

 
 , author of Arithmetic, Population, and Energy 
 
 Twelve leverage points (to intervene in a system if it is to be managed)model proposed by Donella Meadows, 
 
 
 
 
 
 
 
 
 
 
 
 , proponent of the Latin American World Model''
 
 
 
 
 
 
 
 
 
 
 
 
---

Notes

References

External links

 The Limits to Growth 1972 edition, licensed under a Creative Commons Attribution Noncommercial license
 
 Peak Oil model that correctly tracked the oil output, Scientific Study: Forecasting the limits to the availability and diversity of global conventional oil supply: Validation; from John L Hallock Jr.

1972 non-fiction books
1972 in the environment
2004 non-fiction books
Demographic economic problems
Ecological economics
Books critical of economic growth
Environmental non-fiction books
Futurology books
Peak oil books
Sustainability books
Systems theory books
Demography books